State Road 152 (NM 152) is a  state highway in the US state of New Mexico. NM 152's western terminus is in Santa Clara, at U.S. Route 180 (US 180) and NM 152's eastern terminus is at NM 187 south of Caballo.

Route description

NM 152 begins at an intersection with US 180 in Santa Clara and begins traveling east. It then intersects NM 356 in Hanover. Then roughly  later it intersects NM 35 and then NM 61 in San Lorenzo. Then  further eastward it intersects NM 27 in Hillsboro.  past Hillsboro, NM 152 intersects I-25 and US 85 before reaching its eastern terminus as NM 187 south of Caballo.

History
In 2014, NN 152 suffered significant damage from Hurricane Norbert, with portions of the road washed away and debris covering large stretches of road. Due to the severity of damage, the New Mexico Department of Transportation closed the road indefinitely and stated it could be more than a month until it was re-opened.

Major intersections

See also

 List of state roads in New Mexico

References

External links

152
Transportation in Grant County, New Mexico
Transportation in Sierra County, New Mexico